is a railway station located in  the city of Higashine, Yamagata Prefecture, Japan, operated by the East Japan Railway Company (JR East).

Lines
Higashine Station is served by the Ōu Main Line, and is located 110.6 rail kilometers from the terminus of the line at Fukushima Station.

Station layout
The station has one island platform; however, with the completion of the Yamagata Shinkansen, one side of the platform is used for through traffic of the Shinkansen, leaving the station with effectively a single side platform for bi-directional traffic. The station is unattended.

History
Higashine Station opened as a signal stop on December 5, 1911. The station was absorbed into the JR East network upon the privatization of the JNR on April 1, 1987.

Surrounding area
 Higashime Post Office
 Higashine Onsen

See also
List of Railway Stations in Japan

External links

 JR East Station information 

Railway stations in Japan opened in 1911
Railway stations in Yamagata Prefecture
Ōu Main Line
Higashine, Yamagata